Monte Mars  or Mont Mars , at 2,600 m, is the highest peak of the Biellese Alps, north-western Italy.

Geography 
It is located on the water divide between the Lys Valley (Aosta Valley) and the Elvo Valley (Province of Biella). 
In the SOIUSA (International Standardized Mountain Subdivision of the Alps) it gives the name to a mountain group called "Catena Tre Vescovi - Mars".

Access to the summit 

It can be ascended from the south, starting from the Sanctuary of Oropa or, from the North, starting from the Lys Valley. The summit provides a panorama across the plains of the Po Valley and of the Monte Rosa massif.

A classical climbing route reaches the summit following the SSW ridge of the mountain, named Crête de Carisey.

Mountain huts 
 Coda Mountain Hut (2,280 m)

Maps
 Italian official cartography (Istituto Geografico Militare - IGM); on-line version: www.pcn.minambiente.it
 Province of Biella cartography: Carta dei sentieri della Provincia di Biella, 1:25.00 scale, 2004; on line version:  webgis.provincia.biella.it
 Carta dei sentieri e dei rifugi, 1:50.000 scale, nr. 9 Ivrea, Biella e Bassa Valle d'Aosta, Istituto Geografico Centrale - Torino

References

This article was originally translated from its counterpart on the Italian Wikipedia, specifically from this version.

Mountains of the Biellese Alps
Mountains of Piedmont
Mountains of Aosta Valley
Province of Biella
Two-thousanders of Italy